Shelburne Farms is a nonprofit education center for sustainability,  working farm, and National Historic Landmark on the shores of Lake Champlain in Shelburne, Vermont.  The property is nationally significant as a well-preserved example of a Gilded Age "ornamental farm", developed in the late 19th century with architecture by Robert Henderson Robertson and landscaping by Frederick Law Olmsted.

Description and history
Shelburne Farms was created in 1886 by Dr. William Seward Webb and Eliza Osgood Vanderbilt Webb as a model agricultural estate, using money inherited from railroad magnate William Henry Vanderbilt. The estate was created by purchasing a large number of mostly agricultural properties, and then adapting the existing roads and lanes (some of which were public ways the Webbs petitioned to have closed) to fulfill the Webbs' vision for the estate. The property was listed on the National Register of Historic Places in 1980, and was designated a National Historic Landmark District in 2001.

Shelburne Farms was incorporated as a nonprofit educational organization in 1972 by descendants of the Webbs. Nearly  of sustainably managed woodlands received Green Certification from the Forest Stewardship Council in 1998.  The farm's grass-based dairy supports a herd of 125 purebred, registered Brown Swiss cows. Their milk is made into farmhouse cheddar cheese. The farm serves as an educational resource by practicing rural land use that is environmentally, economically and culturally sustainable.

See also
List of National Historic Landmarks in Vermont
National Register of Historic Places listings in Chittenden County, Vermont

References

External links
Shelburne Farms Website
A Pastoral Preserve Faces the Future in Smithsonian Magazine by Chris Granstrom,  May 1998.
Opulence and comfort on a Vanderbilt scale in The Boston Globe By Patricia Harr and David Lyon, September 12, 2004

National Historic Landmarks in Vermont
Shelburne, Vermont
1886 establishments in Vermont
Houses completed in 1887
Vermont culture
Robert Henderson Robertson buildings
Shingle Style houses
Buildings and structures in Shelburne, Vermont
Tourist attractions in Chittenden County, Vermont
Environmental education in the United States
Farms on the National Register of Historic Places in Vermont
Vanderbilt family residences
Historic districts on the National Register of Historic Places in Vermont
National Register of Historic Places in Chittenden County, Vermont
Shingle Style architecture in Vermont
Gilded Age mansions